Louder is the debut studio album by American pop rock band R5, which was released on September 24, 2013 by Hollywood Records. Louder was also released as a deluxe edition, with four extra tracks only available for digital download. As of October 2014, Louder has sold 150,000 physical copies in the US.

Background and composition
"We wanted to put out a fun album," says Rydel Lynch and Ratliff said "We wanted to make an upbeat and inspirational album you want to play 24/7."

Louder is mainly a pop and pop rock record. The album discusses themes such as love, youth and freedom.

Release
A deluxe version was exclusively sold at Target including the song "Wishing I Was 23" produced by Rocky Lynch, a ZinePak exclusively sold at Justice included stickers and the bonus track as well. A deluxe edition of the album was released in Japan in November, which includes another bonus track, "Crazy Stupid Love".

Chart performance
The album debuted on the Billboard 200 at number 24 selling 15,000 copies in first week.

Reception

Louder received mixed reviews from critics. AllMusic's Tim Sendra praised Louder as a "strong, uncluttered and fun modern pop confection." Also, he praised Rydel, who has a vocal feature in "Love Me Like That". Musichel called Louder R5's impressive "grand entrance into the world of pop music", also adding that "R5's future is set for the sky and beyond." Xinhua of Spin or Bin says the album's "lacks of charisma" but praised Ross', Riker's and Rocky's vocal abilities. Paul Lim, from Singaporean newspaper Today, called the album "immature, repetitive" and "even annoying". He also compared Louder with Katy Perry and Justin Bieber. He concluded saying that the band was "a joke". Megan Phelan from Mountain Weekly News said, "there is not much to differentiate the band's sound from other trendy pop acts." However, she gave the band "extra credit" for playing their instruments.

Singles
"Loud" was previously released as the lead single from double releases: the EP Loud EP and the album Louder. It was released on February 19, 2013. 
The second single was "Pass Me By", released on August 20, 2013.  
On December 25, 2013, the band released "(I Can't) Forget About You" as the third single. 
"One Last Dance" was released as the fourth and final single on May 30, 2014. All singles were accompanied by their respective music video.

Promotional Singles
Love Me Like That was released as the only promotional single on September 16, 2013.

Track listing
All tracks produced by Emanuel Kiriakou and Andrew Goldstein, except where noted.

Notes:
All physical copies of the album list the second track as "Forget About You"; upon its release as a single, it was retitled "(I Can't) Forget About You".

Personnel
Credits for Louder adapted from Allmusic.

Evan "Kidd" Bogart - Composer, Executive Producer
Nathaniel Boone - Composer
Mike Daly - A&R
Chris Gehringer - Mastering
Andrew Goldstein - Composer, Editing, Engineer, Instrumentation, Producer
John Hanes - Mixing Assistant, Mixing Engineer
Emanuel Kiriakou - Composer, Executive Producer, Instrumentation, Producer
Jens Koerkeimer - Composer, Editing, Engineer
Denis Kosiak - Assistant Engineer
Savan Kotecha - Composer
Mark Lynch - Management

Riker Lynch - Bass, Composer, Vocals
Rocky Lynch - Composer, Guitar, Vocals
Ross Lynch - Composer, Guitar, Vocals
Rydel Lynch - Keyboards, Vocals
Stormie Lynch - Stylist
Tony Oller - Composer
R5 - Composer, Primary Artist
Ellington Ratliff - Drums, Vocals
Andre Recke - Management
Ed Reyes - Keyboards, Vocals
Lindy Robbins - Composer
Anabel Sinn - Art Direction, Design
Dave Snow - Creative Director
Pat Thrall - Editing, Engineer
Mio Vukovic - A&R
Sarah Yeo - A&R

Charts

References

R5 (band) albums
2013 debut albums
Hollywood Records albums